The 1999 Rice Owls football team represented Rice University in the 1999 NCAA Division I-A college football season. The Owls, led by head coach Ken Hatfield, played their home games at Rice Stadium in Houston, Texas.

Schedule

References

Rice
Rice Owls football seasons
Rice Owls football